Novopokrovka is a rural locality (a selo) in Nikolayevsky Selsoviet of Ivanovsky District, Amur Oblast, Russia. The population was 160 as of 2018. There are 3 streets.

Geography 
Novopokrovka is located on the left bank of the Belaya River, 55 km northeast of Ivanovka (the district's administrative centre) by road. Nikolayevka is the nearest rural locality.

References 

Rural localities in Ivanovsky District, Amur Oblast